Woodbine Racetrack is a race track for Thoroughbred horse racing in the Etobicoke area of Toronto, Ontario, Canada. Owned by Woodbine Entertainment Group, Woodbine Racetrack manages and hosts Canada's most famous race, the King's Plate. The track was opened in 1956 with a one-mile oval dirt track, as well as a seven-eights turf course. It has been extensively remodeled since 1993, and since 1994 has had three racecourses.

History

The current Woodbine carries the name originally used by a racetrack which operated in southeast Toronto, at Queen Street East and Kingston Road, from 1874 through 1993. (While the Old Woodbine Race Course was at the south end of Woodbine Avenue, the current Woodbine is nowhere near it.) In 1951, it was operated by the Ontario Jockey Club (OJC) and held the prestigious King's Plate, but it competed with several other racetracks in Ontario and was in need of modernization.

During the 1950s, the OJC, under the leadership of Canadian industrialist and horse breeder E.P. Taylor, began a program of racetrack acquisitions aimed at becoming the biggest and most profitable operator in Ontario horse racing, similar to Taylor's earlier acquisitions and consolidations in the Canadian brewing industry.

In 1953, the OJC bought Stamford Park in Belleville. It was closed and redeveloped. In 1955, Taylor himself purchased the competing Orpen-owned Dufferin Park Racetrack and Long Branch Racetracks for  million ($ in  dollars). The Orpen tracks were closed and redeveloped, and the Orpen race charters transferred to the OJC. The OJC continued the Canadian International and Cup and Saucer stakes races that had been held at the Orpen tracks. The racing charters acquired from the other tracks enabled the OJC to run 196 days of racing, more than double its allowed total of 84 days in 1952.

All of the efforts at racetrack acquisitions and closures were designed to support a new "supertrack". The architect chosen was Earle C. Morgan. Although Morgan had not designed a racetrack, he spent the next two years developing the design in conjunction with Arthur Froelich, who had designed Hollywood Park Racetrack and Garden State Park Racetrack in the United States. The new track was designed to hold 40,000 spectators, have ample parking, three race courses and two training tracks. It had stable space for 1,000 horses and rooms for 700 employees. The grandstand, designed to get as many people as close to the finish line as possible, included several restaurants and cafeterias. Construction on the new supertrack began in 1955.

The new racetrack opened on June 12, 1956, built at a cost of  million ($ in  dollars). It was initially known as the New Woodbine Racetrack. It dropped the New in 1963. The old track was converted to a combined thoroughbred and standardbred track known thereafter as Old Woodbine or, for most of the rest of its history, as Greenwood Raceway (during standardbred meets) and Greenwood Race Track (during thoroughbred meets). The two thoroughbred and two standardbred meets conducted at Greenwood were transferred to the new Woodbine in 1994, which was until then exclusively devoted to thoroughbred racing. On June 30, 1959, Queen Elizabeth II and the Duke of Edinburgh attended the 100th running of the Queen's Plate, and Queen Elizabeth II again on July 4, 2010, attended the 151st running of the Queen's Plate Stakes and presented trophies.

The track was the opening venue for the 1976 Summer Paralympics, and some of the sporting events were held here. The Arlington Million was held at Woodbine in 1988. The Breeders' Cup was held at Woodbine in 1996. The Woodbine facility is also home to the Canadian Horse Racing Hall of Fame. In 2018, the track began using a GPS-based timing system.

In 2022, Woodbine announced plans to add an 8,000-seat soccer-specific stadium and adjoining training facilities in the northeast corner of the property; this would be the presumed new home of York United FC and possibly house a future professional women's soccer club.

Physical attributes

The Taylor turf course and the main dirt course at Belmont Park on New York's Long Island are the only mile-and-a-half layouts in North American thoroughbred racing. In 2016, Woodbine will contest up to 40 turf races running clockwise (right-hand turns) in what are being billed as "EuroTurf" races.

Inside the Taylor course is the  synthetic course for Thoroughbreds. Since April 9, 2016, the surface has been Tapeta;  it was Polytrack from August 31, 2006 through 2015, and a natural dirt surface prior to that.

The innermost oval was originally a 7/8-mile [] grass oval until the E. P. Taylor turf course opened in 1994. It was then converted to a crushed limestone dirt course and was used for harness racing until April 2018. It was then converted back to a second turf course for the 2019 thoroughbred racing season. The first race on the new Inner Turf was run on June 28, 2019 and was won by Bold Rally with Eurico Rosa da Silva aboard.

Portions of the current E. P. Taylor turf course (the backstretch and far turn) originally formed part of a long turf chute that crossed over the dirt course to the inner turf oval at the top of the stretch. This was used for several major races, including Secretariat's final race in the 1973 Canadian International, until the entire E. P. Taylor course was completed in 1994.

Casino
Casino Woodbine opened in 1999, offering a slots parlor and later expanded to table games in 2018. It contains 100+ table games, 3,500+ slot machines, 220+ electronic table games, and 100+ dealer assist stadium gaming. Table games include blackjack, roulette and baccarat. It is open 24 hours a day.

In 2019, construction began to expand the casino to include an art venue.

Horse racing

Standardbred races
Woodbine has been a regular host for the Breeders Crown. Since the event changed to a one-night format in 2010, the facility has hosted three times—2011, 2012, and 2015.

Woodbine was also the host of the  North America Cup for three-year old pacing colts and geldings from 1994–2006. That race along with the Elegant Image Stakes for three-year old filly trotters and the Good Times Stakes for three-year old colt and gelding trotters, have been moved to Woodbine's sister track, Woodbine Mohawk Park.

Starting in 2018, all standardbred racing has been moved to Woodbine Mohawk, as the 7/8 standardbred track is being converted into a 2nd turf course.

Thoroughbred races
The record for most wins by a jockey on a single raceday at Woodbine is seven, set by Richard Grubb on May 16, 1967, and twice equaled by the legendary Canadian jockey Sandy Hawley, first on May 22, 1972 and then again on October 10, 1974.

Major Stakes races for Thoroughbreds run annually at Woodbine include the:
 King's Plate, a stakes for three-year-old Canadian-bred thoroughbreds, first leg of the Canadian Triple Crown. Because the race is restricted to Canadian-bred horses, it is not eligible for grading, despite being one of Canada's most prestigious races
 Northern Dancer Turf Stakes, a turf mile-and-one-half Grade 1 stakes run in early fall as the final prep for the Canadian International or Breeders' Cup Turf
 Breeders' Stakes, a stakes for three-year-old Canadian-bred thoroughbreds, third leg of the Canadian Triple Crown
 Woodbine Mile, a grade I thoroughbred turf stakes
 Canadian International, a grade 1 thoroughbred turf stakes
 E. P. Taylor Stakes, a grade 1 Thoroughbred turf race for fillies and mares

Stakes races restricted to horses foaled in Canada

Bison City Stakes
Breeders' Stakes
Coronation Futurity Stakes
Cup and Saucer Stakes
Plate Trial Stakes
Princess Elizabeth Stakes
King's Plate
Wonder Where Stakes
Woodbine Oaks

Stakes races restricted to horses foaled in Ontario

Achievement Stakes
Carotene Stakes
Clarendon Stakes
Fanfreluche Stakes
Fury Stakes
Jammed Lovely Stakes
Ontario Damsel Stakes
Ontario Lassie Stakes
Queenston Stakes
Shady Well Stakes
Vandal Stakes

Ontario Sire Stakes

Ballade Stakes
Bold Ruckus Stakes
Bull Page Stakes
Bunty Lawless Stakes
Classy 'N Smart Stakes
Deputy Minister Stakes
Frost King Stakes
Kingarvie Stakes
Lady Angela Stakes
La Prevoyante Stakes
Nandi Stakes
New Providence Stakes
Overskate Stakes
Shepperton Stakes
Sir Barton Stakes
South Ocean Stakes
Steady Growth Stakes
Vice Regent Stakes
Victoriana Stakes

CTHS Yearling Sales Stakes

Algoma Stakes
Elgin Stakes
Halton Stakes
Kenora Stakes
Muskoka Stakes
Simcoe Stakes

Grade I
The following graded stakes were formerly ran at Woodbine in 2019:

Grade II

Grade III

Ungraded stakes

Overnight stakes

Alywow Stakes
Belle Mahone Stakes
Charlie Barley Stakes

Discontinued races

Canadian Maturity Stakes
Hill 'n' Dale Stakes
Silver Deputy Stakes

References

Notes

External links

 
 Casino Woodbine
 Woodbine Racetrack at the NTRA
 Clara Thomas Archives and Special Collections, York University – Archival photographs of Woodbine Racetrack from the Toronto Telegram fonds.

 
Horse racing venues in Ontario
Harness racing venues in Canada
Etobicoke
Sports venues in Toronto
Casinos in Ontario
1956 establishments in Ontario
Sports venues completed in 1956